There are multiple types of snow barriers, sometimes known as snow-supporting structures, in use to lessen the damaging impact that snow can have on human development:

Snow shed, a structure designed to collect snow on top, allowing people to pass safely below. Frequently used in mountainous areas
Avalanche net, a netting designed to slow the motion of snow and prevent avalanches
Snow fence, a fencing designed to cause snow drifts down wind, so the snow drifts don't instead happen in an undesired area
Snow guard, a barrier installed on roofs to prevent snow and ice from falling on people below.

See also
Snow bridge, a natural feature
Avalanche control